This is a list of members of the House of Schleswig-Holstein-Sonderburg-Glücksburg, a cadet branch of the House of Oldenburg. It includes men and women who are members of the male-line descent from King Christian IX of Denmark and therefore bore the title of Prince of Denmark (unless giving it up).

Christian IX of Denmark (1818–1906), had 3 sons and 3 daughters;
1. Frederick VIII of Denmark (1843–1912), had 4 sons and 4 daughters;
A. Christian X of Denmark (1870–1947), had 2 sons;
I. Frederick IX of Denmark (1899–1972), had 3 daughters;
a. Margrethe II of Denmark (born 1940), has 2 sons, see Danish Royal Family
b. Princess Benedikte of Denmark (born 1944), married Richard, 6th Prince of Sayn-Wittgenstein-Berleburg, has 1 son and 2 daughters
c. Princess Anne-Marie of Denmark, Queen of Greece (born 1946), married King Constantine II of Greece, has 3 sons and 2 daughters (see below)

II. Hereditary Prince Knud of Denmark (1900–1976), had 2 sons and 1 daughter;
a. Princess Elisabeth of Denmark (1935–2018)
b. Count Ingolf of Rosenborg (born Prince Ingolf of Denmark) (born 1940)
c. Count Christian of Rosenborg (born Prince Christian of Denmark) (born 1942–2013), had 3 daughters;
i. Countess Josephine of Rosenborg (born 1972), married Thomas Schmidt, has 1 son and 1 daughter
ii. Countess Camille of Rosenborg (born 1972), married Mikael Rosanes, has 3 sons and 1 daughter
iii. Countess Feodora of Rosenborg (born 1975), married Morten Rønnow, has 1 daughter
B. Haakon VII of Norway (1872–1957), had 1 son;
I. Olav V of Norway (1903–1991), had 1 son and 2 daughters;
a. Princess Ragnhild of Norway (1930–2012), married Erling Lorentzen, has 1 son and 2 daughters
b. Princess Astrid of Norway (born 1932), married Johan Ferner, has 2 sons and 3 daughters
c. Harald V of Norway (born 1937), has 1 son and 1 daughter;
i. Princess Märtha Louise of Norway (born 1971), married Ari Behn, has 3 daughters
ii. Haakon, Crown Prince of Norway (born 1973), has 1 son and 1 daughter;
1. Princess Ingrid Alexandra of Norway (born 2004)
2. Prince Sverre Magnus of Norway (born 2005)
C. Princess Louise of Denmark (1875–1906), married Prince Friedrich of Schaumburg-Lippe, had 1 son and 2 daughters
D. Prince Harald of Denmark (1876–1949), had 2 sons and 3 daughters
I. Princess Feodora of Denmark (1910–1975), married Prince Christian of Schaumburg-Lippe, had 3 sons and 1 daughter
II. Princess Caroline-Mathilde of Denmark (1912–1995), married Prince Knud of Denmark, had 2 sons and 1 daughter (see above)
III. Princess Alexandrine-Louise of Denmark (1914–1962), married Count Luitpold of Castell-Castell, had issue
IV. Prince Gorm of Denmark (1919–1991), no issue
V. Count Oluf of Rosenborg (born Prince Oluf of Denmark) (1923–1990), had 1 son and 1 daughter;
a. Count Ulrik of Rosenborg (born 1950), has 1 son and 1 daughter;
i. Comtess Katharina of Rosenborg (born 1982)
ii. Count Philip of Rosenborg (born 1986)
E. Princess Ingeborg of Denmark (1878–1958), married Prince Carl of Sweden, Duke of Västergötland, had 1 son and 3 daughters
F. Princess Thyra of Denmark (1880–1945), no issue
G. Prince Gustav of Denmark (1887–1944), no issue
H. Princess Dagmar of Denmark (1890–1961), married Jørgen Castenskiold, had 3 sons and 1 daughter
2. Princess Alexandra of Denmark, Queen of the United Kingdom (1844–1925), married Edward VII of the United Kingdom, had 3 sons and 3 daughters
3. George I of Greece (born Prince Vilhelm of Denmark) (1845–1913), had 5 sons and 3 daughters;
A. Constantine I of Greece (1868–1923), had 3 sons and 3 daughters;
I. George II of Greece (1890–1947), no issue
II. Alexander of Greece (1893–1920), had 1 daughter;
a. Princess Alexandra of Greece and Denmark, Queen of Yugoslavia (1921–1993), married Peter II of Yugoslavia, had 1 son
III. Princess Helen of Greece and Denmark, Queen of Romania (1896–1982), married Carol II of Romania, had 1 son
IV. Paul of Greece (1901–1964), had 1 son and 2 daughters;
a. Princess Sophia of Greece and Denmark, Queen of Spain (born 1938), married Juan Carlos I of Spain, has 1 son and 2 daughters

b. Constantine II of Greece (1940–2023), has 3 sons and 2 daughters;
i. Princess Alexia of Greece and Denmark (born 1965), married Carlos Morales Quintana, has 1 son and 3 daughters
ii. Pavlos, Crown Prince of Greece (born 1967), has 4 sons and 1 daughter;
1. Princess Maria-Olympia of Greece and Denmark (born 1996)
2. Prince Constantine Alexios of Greece and Denmark (born 1998)
3. Prince Achileas-Andreas of Greece and Denmark (born 2000)
4. Prince Odysseas-Kimon of Greece and Denmark (born 2004)
5. Prince Aristide Stavros of Greece and Denmark (born 2008)
iii. Prince Nikolaos of Greece and Denmark (born 1969)
iv. Princess Theodora of Greece and Denmark (born 1983)
v. Prince Philippos of Greece and Denmark (born 1986)
c. Princess Irene of Greece and Denmark (born 1942)
V. Princess Irene of Greece and Denmark (1904–1974), married Prince Aimone, Duke of Aosta, had 1 son
VI. Princess Katherine of Greece and Denmark (1913–2007), married Richard Brandam, had 1 son
B. Prince George of Greece and Denmark (1869–1957), had 1 son and 1 daughter;
I. Prince Peter of Greece and Denmark (1908–1980), no issue
II. Princess Eugénie of Greece and Denmark (1910–1989), married Prince Dominic Radziwiłł, had 1 son and 1 daughter; married Raymundo, Duke of Castel Duino, had 1 son
C. Princess Alexandra of Greece and Denmark (1870–1891), married Grand Duke Paul Alexandrovich of Russia, had 1 son and 1 daughter
D. Prince Nicholas of Greece and Denmark (1872–1938), had 3 daughters;
I. Princess Olga of Greece and Denmark (1903–1997), married Prince Paul of Yugoslavia, had 1 son and 2 daughters
II. Princess Elizabeth of Greece and Denmark (1904–1955), married Carl Theodor, Count of Toerring-Jettenbach, had 1 son and 1 daughter
III. Princess Marina of Greece and Denmark (1906–1968), married Prince George of the United Kingdom, Duke of Kent, had 2 sons and 1 daughter
E. Princess Maria of Greece and Denmark (1876–1940), married Grand Duke George Mikhaelovich of Russia, had 2 daughters; married Perikles Ioannidis, no issue
F. Princess Olga of Greece and Denmark (born 1881), died young
G. Prince Andrew of Greece and Denmark (1882–1944), had 1 son and 4 daughters;
I. Princess Margarita of Greece and Denmark (1905–1981), married Gottfried, 8th Prince of Hohenlohe-Langenburg, had 4 sons and 1 daughter
II. Princess Theodora of Greece and Denmark (1906–1969), married Berthold, Margrave of Baden, had 2 sons and 1 daughter
III. Princess Cecilie of Greece and Denmark (1911–1937), married Georg Donatus, Hereditary Grand Duke of Hesse, had 3 sons and 1 daughter
IV. Princess Sophie of Greece and Denmark (1914–2001), married Prince Christoph of Hesse, had 2 sons and 3 daughters; married Prince George William of Hanover, had 2 sons and 1 daughter
V. Prince Philip, Duke of Edinburgh (born Prince of Greece and Denmark) (1921-2021), had 3 sons and 1 daughter;
a. Charles III (born 1948), has 2 sons;
i. William, Prince of Wales (born 1982), has 2 sons and 1 daughter;
1. Prince George of Wales (born 2013)
2. Princess Charlotte of Wales (born 2015)
3. Prince Louis of Wales (born 2018)
ii. Prince Harry, Duke of Sussex (born 1984), has 1 son and 1 daughter;
1. Prince Archie of Sussex (born 2019)
2. Princess Lilibet of Sussex (born 2021)
b. Anne, Princess Royal (born 1950), married Mark Phillips, had 1 son and 1 daughter, divorced; married Sir Timothy Laurence, no issue
c. Prince Andrew, Duke of York (born 1960), has 2 daughters;
i. Princess Beatrice (born 1988)
ii. Princess Eugenie (born 1990)
d. Prince Edward, Duke of Edinburgh (born 1964), has 1 son and 1 daughter;
i. Lady Louise Windsor (born 2003)
ii. James, Earl of Wessex (born 2007)
H. Prince Christopher of Greece and Denmark (1888–1940), had 1 son;
I. Prince Michael of Greece and Denmark (born 1939), has 2 daughters;
a. Princess Alexandra of Greece (born 1968), married Nicolas Mirzayantz, has 2 sons
b. Princess Olga of Greece (born 1971), married Prince Aimone, Duke of Apulia, has 1 son
4. Princess Dagmar of Denmark (1847–1928), married Alexander III of Russia, had 4 sons and 2 daughters
5. Princess Thyra of Denmark (1853–1933), married Ernest Augustus, Crown Prince of Hanover, had 3 sons and 3 daughters
6. Prince Valdemar of Denmark (1858–1939), had 4 sons and 1 daughter;
A. Prince Aage, Count of Rosenborg (born Prince Aage of Denmark) (1887–1940), had 1 son;
I. Count Valdemar of Rosenborg (1915–1995)
B. Prince Axel of Denmark (1888–1964), had 2 sons;
I. Prince George Valdemar of Denmark (1920–1986), no issue
II. Count Flemming Valdemar of Rosenborg (born Prince Flemming of Denmark) (1922–2002), had 3 sons and 1 daughter;
a. Count Axel of Rosenborg (born 1950), has 2 sons and 2 daughters;
i. Countess Julie of Rosenborg (born 1977)
ii. Count Carl Johan of Rosenborg (born 1979)
iii. Countess Désirée of Rosenborg (born 1990)
iv. Count Alexander of Rosenborg (born 1993)
b. Count Birger of Rosenborg (born 1950), has 1 daughter;
i. Countess Benedikte of Rosenborg (born 1975)
c. Count Carl Johan of Rosenborg (born 1952), has 2 daughters;
i. Countess Caroline of Rosenborg (born 1984)
ii. Countess Josefine of Rosenborg (born 1999)
d. Countess Désirée of Rosenborg (born 1955), has 2 sons and 1 daughter
C. Count Erik of Rosenborg (born Prince Erik of Denmark) (1890–1950), had 1 son and 1 daughter;
I. Countess Alexandra of Rosenborg (1927–1992), married Ivar Emil Vind, no issue
II. Count Christian of Rosenborg (1932–1997), had 1 son and 1 daughter;
a. Count Valdemar of Rosenborg (born 1965), has 1 son and 1 daughter;
i. Count Nicolai of Rosenborg (born 1997)
ii. Countess Marie of Rosenborg
b. Countess Marina of Rosenborg (born 1971)
D. Count Viggo of Rosenborg (born Prince Viggo of Denmark) (1893–1970), no issue
E. Princess Margaret of Denmark (1895–1992), married Prince René of Bourbon-Parma, had 3 sons and 1 daughter

Prince Carl of Denmark discontinued use of his Danish titles upon accepting the Norwegian throne, becoming King Haakon VII.

Prince Philip of Greece and Denmark gave up the use of his Greek and Danish titles before marrying Princess Elizabeth, heiress to the British throne.

The Greek royal family continues to use the title "Prince(ss) of Greece and Denmark", but none of them have any succession rights in Denmark since 1953.

See also
Danish Royal Family
Greek Royal Family
Norwegian Royal Family
List of members of the House of Oldenburg

 

Danish monarchy
Greek monarchy
Norwegian monarchy